Andreas de Nole (1598 – 1638), was a Flemish sculptor.

Biography
He was born in Antwerp, where he trained before travelling to Rome. He became the teacher of Sebastiaen de Neve and is known today for his work on the apostle and evangelist statues in the St. Rumbold's Cathedral in Mechelen. He worked on that project together with the sculptor Johannes van Mildert and his son Cornelis van Mildert.

He died in Antwerp.

References

Andreas de Nole mentioned on Beschermd erfgoed website

1598 births
1638 deaths
Flemish Baroque sculptors
Writers from Antwerp